The Petite rivière à l'Ours - South (English: Little river of the Bear) is a tributary of rivière à l'Ours, flowing successively in the unorganized territory of Lac-Ashuapmushuan and in the municipality of Sainte-Hedwidge, in the Le Domaine-du-Roy Regional County Municipality, in the administrative region of Saguenay–Lac-Saint-Jean, in the province of Quebec, in Canada.

The Little Bear River valley is served by forest roads.

Forestry is the main economic activity in this valley, as well as recreational tourism activities in the Zec de la Lièvre area.

The surface of the Little Bear River is usually frozen from the beginning of December to the end of March, except the rapids areas; however, safe traffic on the ice is generally from mid-December to mid-March.

Geography 
The Little Bear River takes its source from the Three Islands Lake, in Zec de la Lièvre in the unorganized territory of Lac-Ashuapmushuan. This lake is fed by the outlet (coming from the north) of two lakes including Lac Paul. The mouth of this small lake is located at:
  south of downtown Saint-Félicien;
  southwest of downtown Sainte-Hedwidge;
  south-west of the mouth of the Ashuapmushuan River;
  south of the mouth of the Little Bear River - South.

  towards the east, forming a loop towards the south, then a hook towards the north, to continue towards the east by collecting a stream (coming from the north), until a river bend corresponding to the outlet (coming from the south) of Lac Émile;
  north-west first by crossing an area of marshland, crossing the full length of Lake Nemrods and collecting the outlet (coming from the east) from Lac de la Linotte, up to the outlet (coming from the east) from lakes Maurice and l'Orignal;
  to the north by collecting a stream (coming from the west), then forming some streamers, to its mouth.

The Little Bear River flows into a bend on the southeast bank of the rivière à l'Ours. This confluence is located at:

  south of downtown Saint-Félicien;
  west of downtown Sainte-Hedwidge;
  south-west of the mouth of the Ashuapmushuan River;
  southwest of downtown Roberval.

Toponymy 
The rivière à l'Ours has two tributaries with the same toponymic designation: Little Bear River. The watercourse covered by this article constitutes the southern branch.

The toponym "Little Bear River" was formalized on February 25, 1976, at the Place Names Bank of the Commission de toponymie du Québec.

Notes and references

External links 

Rivers of Saguenay–Lac-Saint-Jean
Le Domaine-du-Roy Regional County Municipality